Venkatachalam may refer to:

Places
Venkatachalam Karuppan, 1982, India, Tamil Nadu, Kallimandayam.
Venkatachalam mandal or Venkatachellum, a village and a Mandal in Nellore district in the state of Andhra Pradesh in India
Venkatachalam railway station, located in the Indian state of Andhra Pradesh, serving Venkatachalam in Nellore district
Venkatachalam Palli (also referred to as Venkatachalampalli), a village in the Darsi Mandal of the Prakasam district located in the southern state of Andhra Pradesh, India
 16214 Venkatachalam, a minor planet

Persons
A. Venkatachalam (1955–2010), Indian politician and former MLA from Alangudi, Tamil Nadu, India
Arivazhagan Venkatachalam, Tamil film director 
G. Venkatachalam, Indian politician and member of the Tamil Nadu Legislative Assembly from the Salem West constituency
Jothi Venkatachalam (1917-?), Indian politician and a former Governor of Kerala and Member of the Legislative Assembly of Tamil Nadu
Karnam Venkatachalam (1874–1934), Indian government official, attaining posting of Karnam. During British reign he was the chief of village people in Thamaraikulam.
Manjeri Venkatachalam, pathologist
N. D. Venkatachalam, Indian politician and member of the Tamil Nadu Legislative Assembly from the Perundurai constituency
P. A. Venkatachalam, Indian academic
V. Venkatachalam (1925–2002), eminent Sanskrit scholar
Venkatachalam Ramaswamy, Indian Director of the Geophysical Fluid Dynamics Laboratory of the National Oceanic and Atmospheric Administration (NOAA) Office of Oceanic and Atmospheric Research (OAR)
Venkatachalam Karuppan, As Chemical Engineer